Artemisia annua, also known as sweet wormwood, sweet annie, sweet sagewort, annual mugwort or annual wormwood, is a common type of wormwood native to temperate Asia, but naturalized in many countries including scattered parts of North America. 

An extract of A. annua, called artemisinin (or artesunate), is a medication used to treat malaria. Discovery of artemisinin and its antimalarial properties by the Chinese scientist, Tu Youyou, led to award of the 2011 Lasker Prize and 2015 Nobel Prize in Physiology or Medicine.

Description
Artemisia annua belongs to the plant family of Asteraceae and is an annual short-day plant.  Its stem is erect brownish or violet brown. The plant itself is hairless and naturally grows from 30 to 100 cm tall, although in cultivation it is possible for plants to reach a height of 200 cm. The leaves of A. annua have a length of 3–5 cm and are divided by deep cuts into two or three small leaflets. The intensive aromatic scent of the leaves is characteristic. The artemisinin content in dried leaves is in between 0% and 1.5%. New hybrids of Artemisia annua developed in Switzerland can reach a leaf artemisinin content of up to 2%. The small flowers have a diameter of 2–2.5 mm and are arranged in loose panicles. Their color is green-yellowish. The seeds are brown achenes with a diameter of only 0.6–0.8 mm. Their thousand-kernel weight (TKW) averages around 0.03 g (in comparison, wheat has a TKW of approximately 45 g).

Agricultural practice 

The growing period of Artemisia annua from seeding through to harvest is 190–240 days, depending on the climate and altitude of the production area. The plant is harvested at the beginning of flowering when the artemisinin content is the highest. Dry leaf yields of Artemisia annua plantations vary between 0.5 and 3 tonnes per hectare.

In terms of the climate A. annua prefers sunny and warm conditions. Its optimal growth temperature lies within 20 and 25 °C. Annual temperature sums of 3500–5000 °C (sum of temperatures higher 10 °C over one year) are required to guarantee a proper maturing. The rainfall during the growing season should not be less than 600 mm (annual rainfall higher 1150 mm). Especially the seedlings of A. annua. are susceptible to drought or water lodging. The mature plants on the other hand are quite resistant to those climate conditions. Nevertheless, the preferred soil conditions for A. annua are light soils with deep topsoils and good drainage properties. But it is reported, that the plant is adaptable to different soil types. Paired with the relatively low demand on the environment Artemisia annua can have characteristics of a neophytic plant.

A. annua is best sown in rows to facilitate removal of weeds, which has to be done mechanically or manually because herbicides are typically not used. It is recommended to sow 1.4 – 2 seeds per square meter. The fertilizer requirements are on a low level. Potassium should be used as base fertilizer. It is taken up by the plant during the whole growing season. Nitrogen is required during early branching stages, an amount of approximately 70 kg N/ha is sufficient for the plant. Phosphate on the other hand is required during the blooming stages. Phosphate fertilization can lead to a higher artemsinin content in the leaves. The application of salicylic acid on the leaves shortly before harvesting the plant also can raise its artemisinin content. Besides few viral diseases Artemisia a. has no major diseases that need to be controlled.

The harvest of the plant is best done in the state of flower budding. The whole plant is harvested and cut into branches which are dried in the sun or in an oven. The drying temperature should not exceed 40 °C. The dry branches are shaken or beaten to separate the leaves from the stem. The leaves are then packed into fabric bags and shipped to further processing. It is important that the temperatures during transportation and storage never get higher than 40 °C, otherwise artemisinin gets volatile and is lost into the air. The leaves should not be crushed before long time storage (one year). The optimal storage conditions are either 20 °C with 85% relative humidity (RH) or 30 °C with 30–40% RH.

Artemisinin and other phytochemicals

In 1971, scientists demonstrated the plant extracts had antimalarial activity in primate models, and in 1972, the active ingredient, artemisinin (formerly referred to as arteannuin), was isolated and its chemical structure described. Artemisinin may be extracted using a low boiling point solvent, such as diethylether, and is found in the glandular trichomes of the leaves, stems, and inflorescences, and is concentrated in the upper portions of plant within new growth. 

The first isolation of artemisinin from the herb occurred from a military project known as Project 523, following the study of traditional medicine pharmacopoeias performed by Tu Youyou and other researchers within the project. A. annua contains diverse phytochemicals, including polyphenols such as coumarins, flavones, flavonols, and phenolic acids which have unknown biological properties in vivo. Other phytochemicals include 38 sesquiterpenes. Dihydroartemisinin is the active metabolite of artemisinin, and artesunate is a water-soluble derivative of artemisinin.

Malaria treatment

Research to develop antimalarial drugs led to the discovery of artemisinin in the 1970s by Chinese scientist, Tu Youyou, who shared the 2015 Nobel Prize in Physiology or Medicine. An improved extract was obtained by using a low-temperature, ether-based extraction method, further showing the artemisinin derivative, artemether, to be an effective antimalarial drug.

Artemisinin is a sesquiterpene lactone with an endoperoxide bridge and has been produced as an antimalarial drug. The efficacy of tea, made with either water or urine and A. annua, for the treatment of malaria is dubious, and is discouraged by the World Health Organization (WHO). Research has found that artemisinin is not soluble in water and the concentrations in these infusions are considered insufficient to treat malaria. A 2012 review stated that artemisinin-based remedies are the most effective drugs for the treatment of malaria. A 2013 review suggested that although Artemisia annua may not cause hepatotoxicity, haematotoxicity, or hyperlipidemia, it should be used cautiously during pregnancy due to a potential risk of embryotoxicity at a high dose.

The WHO has approved riamet (Coartem), a combination of lumefantrine (120 mg) and artemether (an artemisinin derivative extracted with ether, 20 mg) in repeat treatments over two days, producing efficacy of up to 98% against malaria.

Mechanism
The proposed mechanism of action of artemisinin involves cleavage of endoperoxide bridges by iron, producing free radicals (hypervalent iron-oxo species, epoxides, aldehydes, and dicarbonyl compounds) which damage biological macromolecules causing oxidative stress in the cells of the malaria parasite. Malaria is caused by apicomplexans, primarily Plasmodium falciparum, which largely reside in red blood cells and contain iron-rich heme-groups (in the form of hemozoin). In 2015, artemisinin was shown to bind to a large number cell targets, indicating its potential for diverse effects.

Artemisinin resistance 
Despite global efforts in combating malaria, it remains a large burden for the population, particularly in tropical and subtropical regions.  As of 2013, it seems that the pathogenic agent of malaria is becoming resistant to artemisinin-based drugs. Emergence of artemisinin resistance has been identified in Cambodia and the border of Thailand. Although the WHO recommends artemisinin-based remedies for treating uncomplicated malaria, artemisinin resistance has become a concern. The causes that affected the emergence of artemisinin resistance include the use of artemisinin-based remedies. Encouraging herbal alternatives are in the pipeline, but a more dependable solution for the eradication of malaria would be the creation of an effective vaccination. Resistance will likely spread to other endemic areas across the world.

Traditional medicine
In traditional Chinese medicine (TCM), A. annua is prepared with hot water to treat fever. Due to duplication in ancient TCM sources, A. annua is more commonly referred to as qinghao, the modern Chinese name for Artemisia carvifolia, as opposed to its current Chinese name huanghuahao.

References

External links

Distribution of artemisinin in Artemisia annua
Project to improve artemesinin yield at the University of York (UK)
Data sheet about Artemisia annua from Purdue University

annua
Medicinal plants of Asia
Flora of Asia
Plants described in 1753
Taxa named by Carl Linnaeus